The United Progressive Party is a political party in Antigua and Barbuda. It was previously led by Baldwin Spencer, it was the governing party from 2004 to 2014. It has been in opposition since the 2014 election and is now led by Harold Lovell. However, Harold recently resigned on Friday 20 January 2023. As a result, Jamale L. Pringle is now leader of the party. (who serves as Leader of the Opposition in parliament as the only United Progressive Party member who won a seat in the 2018 general election).

Foundation

The United Progressive Party was formed in 1992 through a merger of three parties, namely the Antigua Caribbean Liberation Movement, the Progressive Labour Movement and the United National Democratic Party. Each party was in opposition to the Antigua Labour Party government. Baldwin Spencer was chosen to lead the new party.

Electoral results

References

External links
Official website

Political parties in Antigua and Barbuda
Social democratic parties in North America
Political parties established in 1992
1992 establishments in Antigua and Barbuda